Načešice is a municipality and village in Chrudim District in the Pardubice Region of the Czech Republic. It has about 700 inhabitants.

Administrative parts
The village of Licomělice is an administrative part of Načešice.

References

External links

Villages in Chrudim District